is a Japanese voice actress. Although she has an extensive vocal range, voicing a large variety of characters throughout her career, she is commonly typecasted as young males, achieving mainstream success as her roles in Hunter × Hunter as Kurapika, The Prince of Tennis as Shusuke Fuji, Shōnen Onmyōji as Abe no Masahiro. and Hetalia: Axis Powers and Hetalia World Series as China or Yao Wang. She was formerly affiliated with the talent management agency Toritori Office, but is currently freelance.

She is one of the few Japanese voice actors to have completed their formal education in the United States. Consequently, she can speak multiple languages with varying degrees of fluency outside of Japanese. She is affectionately nicknamed  by her Japanese fans.

Biography

Career
Kaida was born in Tokyo, Japan, and was raised in the Shinjuku ward of the city. Shortly following her graduation from Shinjuku High School, she enrolled in the International University of Art and Music in San Diego, California, and studied abroad for four years, where she majored in musical theater. She returned to Japan to focus on voice acting, making her debut in the OVA Southern Wind as Himiko, followed up by some minor roles in other television animation; but her first major role as a voice actor came when she was cast as Kurapika in Hunter × Hunter in 1999, after which her popularity began to grow. However, she went on to perform her arguably most well-known role, that of Shusuke Fuji in The Prince of Tennis, which began airing in 2001; she reprises the role for later adaptations as well as for voice acting events to promote the series and for CDs sung as the character. She is also known for her wide vocal range and feminine natural voice, being skilled at voicing males as well as adult women such as Ouka from .hack//Legend of the Twilight, gag characters such as Son Goku/Patalliro from Patalliro Saiyuki!, and young females such as Machi Kuragi from Fruits Basket.

In addition to voice acting, she is also a prominent radio personality, and is the current announcer for Sadao Watanabe's radio show, Nightly Yours. She is also a member of the voice acting unit AZU alongside Junko Takeuchi and Junko Minagawa, and is a member of the unit Takada Hiroyuki alongside Hiroki Takahashi.

Personal life
She is notably multilingual, competent in French and Chinese, as well as being a fluent English speaker; the latter being evident in her Western education, her interest in Queen and the Chronicles of Narnia, and also by having an all-English speaking role as Angela Burton in Genshiken. Her other hobbies include watching rakugo, especially Kosanji Yanagiya, and baseball, while she also has a pet dog named Vivian. She is commonly mistaken for her friend and fellow voice actress Yūko Kaida, due to the fact that their names differ by only two characters and one letter in romanization.

Filmography

Animation

OVA/ONA

Film

Drama CD

Video Games

Musical Theater 

 Hunter x Hunter Musical - Kurapika
 Hunter X Hunter: The Nightmare of Zaoldyeck - Kurapika

Dubbing
 Elias: The Little Rescue Boat – Sentimental (Marit A. Andreaseen), Little Blinky (Morten Røhrt)
Thank You for Smoking – Joey Naylor (Cameron Bright)
Unaccompanied Minors – Charlie Goldfinch (Tyler James Williams)

References

External links
 
Yuki Kaida at the Seiyuu Database

Yuki Kaida at IMDb

Living people
Japanese video game actresses
Japanese voice actresses
Voice actresses from Tokyo
Year of birth missing (living people)